Bishop Westcott Boys' School (BWBS) is a boys' schools in eastern India. It focuses on all round development of students through various co-curricular activities. The school is located on the banks of the Subarnarekha River in Namkum block,  from Ranchi, the capital of Jharkhand. The school is run by a managing committee, the Chotanagpur Dioecse Society, formed by the governing body, which comprises educators and citizens. Richard Ian Thornton is the present principal of the institution. It is one of the oldest schools in the area. 

Founded on 24 February 1927 by Dr. Foss Westcott, the school building served as a makeshift hospital during World War II.

Curriculum
The school is affiliated with the Council for the Indian School Certificate Examinations (CISCE). The students are a mix of boarders (hostelers) and day scholars.

The senior students are delegated responsibility by the school authority through their elevation as members of the Prefectorial Board, which is led by the school captain. Vice-captains on either wing assist the captain.

Participation in sporting events is encouraged through dedicated hours for boarding students. The school has facilities for soccer, volleyball, basketball, lawn tennis, table tennis, snooker and horse riding. 

The school has three canteens: The Bake Ville, The Witches Brew and The Retreat.

History 
The Bishop Westcott Boys' School was founded by Dr. Foss Westcott, Bishop of Chotanagpur, in 1927. The school originally consisted of a C-shaped "Main Building." A new hostel building was constructed, which houses an 800+ capacity dormitory.

Campus 
The school consists of an office building, another building for the library and laboratory, a juniors hostel, a sick room, servants' quarter, staff residence, the principal's bungalow and playgrounds. A swimming pool is under construction. A 1,000+ capacity auditorium offers modern facilities for students' cultural activity.

Alumni association 
The Ex-Westcottian Association (EWA) is the combined alumni of the boys' school, Bishop Westcott Girls' School, Namkum, Bishop Westcott Girls' School, Doranda, Bishop's School, Bahubazar and Bishop School Soiko, Khunti.

Chapters operate in Calcutta and Delhi.

References 

Church of North India schools
Boys' schools in India
High schools and secondary schools in Jharkhand
Boarding schools in Jharkhand
Christian schools in Jharkhand
Schools in Ranchi
Educational institutions established in 1927
1927 establishments in India